Mala onda is a Chilean Bildungsroman novel and social commentary by Alberto Fuguet. It is also Fuguet's debut novel, first published in 1991.

Mala onda is set in Chile during a ten-day period in September, 1980, around the time of the Chilean constitutional referendum. The protagonist is Matías Vicuña, a maladjusted, upper class, 17-year-old boy who is jaded and frustrated by what he perceives as the folly and blandness of his family and peers. Matías lives a loveless, meaningless life, and indulges in sex, drugs, alcohol, and rock music.

The novel examines the Chilean emulation of American consumerism and pop culture, in the context of a growing opposition to the dictatorial rule of Augusto Pinochet in Chile.

Time and Place
The novel takes place in 1980 in Santiago, Chile during the political referendum of the country's future with Pinochet. The protagonist visits Rio, Brazil briefly in the beginning of the novel. He also goes to Reñaca, a resort in the region on Valparaiso. Other than these, the main location is the urban setting of Santiago. The neighborhoods mentioned in the novel within Santiago include Providencia, Ñuñoa, and Las Condes.

Matías finds comfort in J.D. Salinger's The Catcher in the Rye, relating to Holden Caulfield's cynicism and teenage angst. The novel culminates with Matías attempting to replicate Holden's self-inflicted isolation by fleeing his family, friends, and academics. He even purchases a red hunting hat to complete the persona. Ultimately, however, Matías is reunited with his father. Despite familial bouleversements, Matías finds peace and learns to embrace change: symbolizing the trepidation Chile faces as it undergoes a transition of power.

Characters
Matías Vicuña - protagonist, teenage boy
Esteban Vicuña - Matías' father
Rosario Jaeger de Vicuña - Matias' mother
Nacho - Matías' best friend, military background, daddy issues
Antonia - Matías' crush
Cassia - Matías' Brazilian fling
Alejandro Paz - Matías' friend, Marxist barkeeper, obsessed with the United States
Flora - Matías' teacher
Carmen - Vicuñas' family housemaid 
Josh Remsen - American rock singer-songwriter

See also
McOndo
The Catcher in the Rye

External links

1992 Chilean novels
Bildungsromans
Chilean historical novels
Novels about consumerism
Novels about drugs
Novels by Alberto Fuguet
Novels set in Chile
Novels set in the 1980s
Spanish-language novels
Fiction set in 1980
1992 debut novels